Gyang Dalyop Dantong (20 February 1959 – 8 July 2012) was a Nigerian senator who represented the People's Democratic Party (PDP) in Plateau State. He became a member of the Nigerian Senate in 2007. He previously served as a Honourable Member in the House of Representatives representing Barkin-Ladi/Riyom Federal Constituency from 2003 to 2007. 
Dantong died on 8 July 2012 when attending a mass funeral of people who had been killed by Fulani herdsmen in Matse area of Riyom local government in Plateau State. The people at the funeral were attacked by gunmen thought to also be Fulani.

Background

Dantong was born on 20 February 1959. He has an MBBS from the University of Jos and an MPH from the University of Ghana, Legon. He was a Medical Director of Vom Christian Hospital. He was a member of the House of Representatives of Nigeria in the 5th (2003–2007) Assembly, representing the Barkin Ladi and Riyom constituency. In October 2004, he donated books, pens and chalk to secondary schools in Plateau State and announced scholarship awards for 40 students.

Senate career

Gyang Dalyop Dantong was elected to the National Senate for the Plateau North constituency in 2007, decisively defeating the previous Deputy Senate President, Alhaji Ibrahim Mantu.  
He was appointed to committees on States & Local Government, Health, Gas, Environment, Drugs Narcotics Anti Corruption and Aviation
In November 2007, he donated five billboards carrying various road traffic cautious to the Federal Road Safety Commission worth N600,000.00.

In a July 2008 interview, the senator described the 40 years of military rule as a period where there was no progress, and said that in just eight years of democracy the country had made more progress.

In September 2008, Dantong called for appointment of a health minister some months after Adenike Grange and Gabriel Adukwu were sacked because of concerns about their financial dealings when in office.
As vice-chairman of the Senate Committee on Health, he spoke out the lack of a national Health framework and indicated that the Senate was working on the Health Bill.

In January 2009, after the impeachment of the former Speaker of the Plateau State Assembly, Emmanuel Go'ar, Dantong said the party accepted the change in the leadership of the House under Istifanus Mwansat.

References

1959 births
2012 deaths
People from Plateau State
Peoples Democratic Party members of the Senate (Nigeria)
21st-century Nigerian politicians